John E. Gunckel (1846–1915) was a passenger agent with the Lake Shore and Michigan Southern Railway who began forming the Toledo, Ohio, Old Newsboys Goodfellow Association in the 1890s and saw its incorporation in 1929.

References

External links
 "Marguerite Martyn Tells of Toledo Man Who Wants to Make Newsboys Good," St. Louis Post-Dispatch, December 14, 1909, microfilm image 4
 Vincent DiGirolamo, Crying the News: A History of America's Newsboys (Oxford University Press, 2019), 262–64, 336–37, 422–23.

1846 births
1915 deaths
Businesspeople from Toledo, Ohio
19th-century American businesspeople